Cobán Athletic is a Honduran football club based in Jesús de Otoro, Honduras.

History
They were promoted to the Honduran second division in summer 2013.

References

Football clubs in Honduras